WL1 is a Swedish sleeping car of the 1960s type carriage. The carriages were built Kalmar Verkstad (KVAB) between 1964 and 1965. The carriages feature 10 sleeping compartments and one shower in their current configuration. The original configuration didn't feature a shower, instead it feature 11 sleeping compartments. The eleventh compartment was replaced by the shower during the 1996-1997 refurbishment of the carriages. The type is also the last of 1960s type carriages that currently is in operation with SJ

The carriages are numbered in the numbers 5013–5037. All carriages except 5020 and 5026 are still intact. The carriages 5020 and 5026 have both been scrapped due to accidents. As of November 2020 another 4 carriages are taken out of service and waiting to be audited. Currently, there is an ongoing procurement process to see which company that is going to complete the audit of the carriages.

Carriages  taken out of service 
 5018 (Awaiting audit)
 5020 (Scrapped)
 5025 (Awaiting audit)
 5026 (Scrapped)
 5029 (Awaiting audit)
 5030 (Awaiting audit)

References 
WL1 på Järnväg.net
Svenska Person- och Motorvagnar 1999, SJK Skriftserie nr. 69, Stockholm 1999 

Rolling stock of Sweden